The Diocese of Castro di Sardegna (Latin: Dioecesis Castrensis) was a Roman Catholic diocese located in the town of Oschiri in the Province of Sassari in the Italian region of Sardinia. In 1503, it was suppressed along with the Diocese of Bisarcio and the Diocese of Ottana to form the Diocese of Alghero.

History

Within the comune of Oschiri is the church of Nostra Signora di Castro, which was once the cathedral episcopal see of a diocese, centred on the now disappeared town of Castro. It was suffragan of the Metropolitan Archdiocese of Sassari.
 
The bishopric dates back to Byzantine times (circa 1000 AD), but the earliest mention of a bishop of Castro is of 1116, when an unnamed bishop of the see assisted at the dedication of the Basilica di Saccargia. In 1164, its bishop Atto dedicated a church in the locality of Aneleto and granted it in the following year to Camaldolese monks.
 
Castro later decayed, and the bishop's residence was transferred to Bono.
 
On 8 December 1503, the territory of Castro and that of two other dioceses were combined to form the new diocese of Alghero (now Alghero-Bosa). Today what was the territory of Castro is part of that of the diocese of Ozieri

Titular see 
Castro itself, no longer a residential bishopric, is listed by the Catholic Church as a titular see since its nominal restoration as a Latin Catholic titular bishopric in 1968, initially simply as Castro, since 1976 as Castro di Sardegna, avoiding confusion with sees named Castro in Lazio and in Puglia.

Bishops

Diocese of Castro di Sardegna
Erected: 1062
Latin Name: Castrensis
Metropolitan: Archdiocese of Sassari

Francesco, O.S.B. (1445–1447 Died)
Giovanni Gasto, O.F.M. (1447–1455 Died)
Tommaso Giliberti, O. Cist. (1455–1458 Died)
Leonardo (1458–1464 Died)
Lorenzo di Moncada, O.F.M. (1464–1478 Died)
Cristoforo Magno (1478–1483 Died)
Bernardo Jover (1483–1490 Died)
Juan Crespo, O.S.A. (1490–1493 Appointed, Bishop of Ales)
Melchiorre di Tremps, O.S.A. (1493–1496 Died)
Giovanni Garsia, O.S.B. (1496–1501 Died)
Antonio de Toro, O.F.M. (1501–1503 Resigned)

8 December 1503: Suppressed along with the Diocese of Bisarcio and the Diocese of Ottana to form the Diocese of Alghero

See also
Catholic Church in Italy

References

Catholic titular sees in Europe
1062 establishments in Europe
1503 disestablishments in Europe